Clade X was a pandemic modelling exercise by Johns Hopkins University's Center for Health Security, which occurred on Tuesday, May 15, 2018, named after the hypothetical novel virus. In the simulation, the hypothetical pandemic resulted in 900 million simulated deaths. The exercise was invitation-only and nearly 150 people attended.

References

External links

Further reading 
 
 
 

Infectious diseases in fiction
Disaster preparedness